Gungahlin Drive Extension (GDE) is a freeway grade road, located in the Belconnen district of Canberra, Australia. It is 8.3 kilometres long and extended the previously existing Gungahlin Drive from the Barton Highway in the district of Gungahlin to the Glenloch Interchange to connect with the Tuggeranong Parkway, Parkes Way, and William Hovell Drive. Early in the planning stages, the GDE was to instead be designated the John Dedman Parkway.

Route description
The GDE consists of two roads: the section of Gungahlin Drive located between Barton Highway and Belconnen Way, and Caswell Drive, located between Belconnen Way and the Glenloch Interchange. Caswell Drive was pre-existing but duplicated and upgraded as part of the works.

History

The Gungahlin Drive Extension project had its genesis in planning that emphasised the motor car as the primary means of travel in Canberra.  This philosophy is shown in planning studies dating from the 1960s.

In 1991, the ACT Liberal Government began consultations for a John Dedman Parkway project, which would have gone from the Barton Highway to Belconnen Way.  This project was subsequently renamed the Gungahlin Drive Extension, with the road proceeding to the Glenloch Interchange.

This Gungahlin Drive Extension route and the Majura Road upgrading (between the Monaro Highway and Federal Highway), are two transport routes that are on the drawing board as north-south routes.  Some consider the GDE route as a crucial link in Canberra's transport network while others consider it a white elephant and support other transport alternatives, such as light rail between Gungahlin and Civic.

The ACT Labor Government won election in 2001 promising a GDE alignment that would travel west of the Australian Institute of Sport AIS.  However, the Commonwealth Government's National Capital Authority decided in December 2002 to support an alignment east of the AIS as the preferred route.  On 16 January 2003 the ACT Government fell in with the NCA and decided to investigate options for an Eastern Alignment for GDE in the vicinity of the AIS, as well as reviewing options for the alignment in the Aranda Precinct.
Supporters of natural parkland campaigned to have the road building stopped, staging a number of demonstrations. However the ACT Government determined that the road be built, and subsequently changed the law to prevent further opposition from community groups.

When the GDE was completed it was controversial as the road was originally built to a 2-lane standard rather than four; leaving southbound and northbound commuters with lengthy delays each morning and afternoon.

Work commenced in October 2009 to widen the 2 lane sections to 4 lanes as originally planned. The area near the south bound lanes leading into the Glenloch interchange was the first area to be widened as this area bears the heaviest traffic load during peak times.

The road has now been completed to a 4 lane freeway standard.

Protests 

When the Gungahlin Drive Extension plans were made public, there were protests by various groups in order to stop or delay work on the road. The main protests came from a group called "Save The Ridge". This group were angry about the destruction of the flora and fauna that would occur with the GDE running through the Bruce / O'Connor Ridge.  Meanwhile, another group called GDE Now! was formed, with a slogan 'Pave the Ridge'.

In 2004 Save The Ridge had a legal victory with the ACT Government in relation to local planning laws.  The ACT Government then passed a new law with the purpose of overriding further legal challenges at the local level.

In 2005 Save The Ridge took the ACT Government and the National Capital Authority to the Federal Court of Australia in a further effort to have the project shut down. In September 2005 the Federal Court ruled in favour of the NCA and the ACT Government, giving the go-ahead for the project to resume.

On 10 December 2006, during Stage 1 of the GDE opening, Save The Ridge again protested against the road, and called for an immediate halt to the rest of the construction taking place. They called the GDE "one of the most expensive non tunnelled single lane roads per kilometre in Australia's history."

Bridge collapse

On 14 August 2010, the eastern duplication bridge of the GDE, over the Barton Highway, partially collapsed.  The new bridge was under construction when it collapsed. ACT Police, ACT Ambulance Service and the ACT Fire Brigade attended the scene and freed one man who was trapped under the rubble. At least 9 people were taken to the Canberra Hospital for treatment and another 5 were injured however there were no critical injuries, all those affected were working on a new span of the bridge. The Barton Highway and northern GDE were closed for several hours as investigations commenced.

The Barton Highway was reopened on 9 September 2010 after investigations and removal of the collapsed bridge.

Construction on the second span started afresh at the end of December 2010 with all contractors taking on board the recommendations made by  ACT Workcover relating to worker safety and materials to ensure that the collapse of the old span is not repeated.

Interchanges
The GDE has multiple interchanges along its length providing access to suburbs and facilities in the Gungahlin and Belconnen districts as well as the Inner North, there are links to several arterial roads.

See also

 Freeways in Australia
 Freeways in Canberra

References

External links 
 Video of the extension (Barton Hwy to Belconnen Way)
 Save The Ridge
 Work on GDE can restart:ruling
 

Streets in Canberra
Two-lane expressways